Isis Giménez (born 30 July 1990) is a Venezuelan fencer. She competed in the women's foil event at the 2016 Summer Olympics.

References

External links
 

1990 births
Living people
Venezuelan female foil fencers
Olympic fencers of Venezuela
Fencers at the 2016 Summer Olympics
Place of birth missing (living people)
Central American and Caribbean Games gold medalists for Venezuela
Central American and Caribbean Games silver medalists for Venezuela
Competitors at the 2014 Central American and Caribbean Games
Competitors at the 2018 Central American and Caribbean Games
Central American and Caribbean Games medalists in fencing
21st-century Venezuelan women